Tērvete Parish is an administrative unit of Dobele Municipality in the Semigallia region of Latvia. At the beginning of 2014, the population of the parish was 2009. The administrative center is Zelmeņi village.

Towns, villages and settlements of Tērvete Parish 
 Klūnas
 Kroņauce
 Mežmalieši
 Tērvete
 Zelmeņi

See also 
 Alberts Kviesis

References

External links 
 

Parishes of Latvia
Dobele Municipality
Semigallia